Army Wives Welfare Association (AWWA) is an Indian non-profit organisation that works for the spouse, children or any dependents of Army personnel. The association was founded in 1966 and aims to rehabilitate war widows and battle casualties. Other than that, the association organises vocational training and empowers the beneficiaries.

The former president of the AWWA, Madhulika Rawat, was also the president of the Defence Wives Welfare Association (DWWA) until 8 December 2021.

See also 
 War Widows Association, New Delhi

References 

Indian Army

Military-related organizations
Veterans' affairs in India